Lygomusotima is a genus of moths of the family Crambidae.

Species
Lygomusotima constricta Solis & Yen in Solis, Yen & Goolsby, 2004
Lygomusotima stria Solis & Yen in Solis, Yen & Goolsby, 2004

References

Musotiminae
Crambidae genera